London Life is a 1924 play by Arnold Bennett and Edward Knoblock. 

It ran for 36 performances at the Drury Lane Theatre in London's West End. It was produced by Basil Dean. The large cast included Clifford Mollison, Henry Ainley, Gordon Harker, Ian Hunter, Edmund Breon, Mary Jerrold and Olive Sloane. It marked the West End debut of Benita Hume, appearing in a small role.

References

Bibliography
 J. P. Wearing. The London Stage 1920-1929: A Calendar of Productions, Performers, and Personnel. Rowman & Littlefield, 2014.

External links
 Full text of London Life at HathiTrust Digital Library

1924 plays
Plays by Edward Knoblock
Works by Arnold Bennett
British plays
West End plays